Acetaldoxime is the chemical compound with formula C2H5NO. It is one of the simplest oxime-containing compounds, and has a wide variety of uses in chemical synthesis.

Properties
Acetaldoxime will often appear as a colorless liquid, or a white solid. Its solid can form two different needle-like crystal structures. The α-form melts at approximately 44 °C - 47 °C, while the β-form melts at 12 °C. The liquid is known to have a pungent odor, and is highly flammable. The compound can act as both an acid or a base, due to its acidic proton on the hydroxyl group and the basic nitrogen atom. The compound exists as a mixture of its Z and E stereoisomers (i.e. syn and anti, or cis and trans) in its normal form. The E stereoisomer can be isolated by slow crystallization of a distilled E/Z mixture.

Production
Acetaldoxime can be prepared by combining pure acetaldehyde and hydroxylamine under heating in the presence of a base.

The use of CaO as a base in the preparation of oximes from various types of ketones and aldehydes under mild conditions also gave quantitative yields.

Reactions

Alkylation 
Deprotonation of acetaldoxime with 2 equivalents of n-butyllithium at -78 °C generates the dianion which reacts with benzyl bromide or 1-iodopropane to give excellent yields of α-alkylated (Z)-oximes. α,α-Dialkylation by further alkylation in similar way has been achieved. It is generally known that ketone oximes can be deprotonated and alkylated regiospecifically syn to the oxime hydroxy group. It is essential to perform the deprotonation and alkylation at -78 °C as otherwise no α-alkylated oximes are isolated, the major byproducts being nitriles.

Rearrangement to acetamide 
Heating of acetaldoxime in xylene in the presence of 0.2 mol % nickel(II) acetate or silica gel as catalyst caused isomerization into acetamide.

Synthesis of heterocycles 
Chlorination of acetaldoxime with N-chlorosuccinimide or chlorine gas in chloroform affords acetohydroxamic acid chloride, which suffers dehydrochlorination with triethylamine to give acetonitrile N-oxide. The latter 1,3-dipole undergoes 1,3-dipolar cycloaddition to alkenes giving 2-isoxazolines in a one-pot procedure. This reaction is also suitable for the construction of more complex molecules such as the conversion of a 6-ethylideneolivanic acid derivative into the corresponding spiroisoxazoline.

Uses
Aldoximes such as acetylaldoxime are using during chemical synthesis processes as intermediates for chemical reactions. It is especially notable for its commercial application as an intermediate for the production of pesticides.

References

Aldoximes